CovertAction Quarterly (formerly CovertAction Information Bulletin) was an American journal in publication from 1978 to 2005, focused primarily on watching and reporting global covert operations. It is generally critical of US Foreign Policy, the Central Intelligence Agency, and capitalism.  CovertAction relaunched in May 2018 as CovertAction Magazine.

History and profile

Covert Action Information Bulletin 
The first issue of the Covert Action Information Bulletin was launched at a press conference in Havana, Cuba, coinciding with the 11th World Festival of Youth and Students.

The magazine was founded by former CIA officer turned agency critic Philip Agee, William Schaap, James and Elsie Wilcott, Ellen Ray, William Kunstler, Michael Ratner, and Lou Wolf in 1978. It was created in order to carry on the work of the preceding publication CounterSpy magazine, which the editors claimed had been shut down as a result of CIA harassment. Contributors included critics of US foreign policy such as Noam Chomsky, Howard Zinn, Michael Parenti and Christopher Hitchens.

Agee said the Bulletin's goal was "a worldwide campaign to destabilize the CIA through exposure of its operations and personnel." The Mitrokhin Archive, by ex-KGB archivist Vasili Mitrokhin and British intelligence historian Christopher Andrew, alleged that Covert Action Information Bulletin received assistance from the Soviet KGB and Cuban DGI. Mitrokhin claimed that the Soviet group RUPOR was responsible for the Bulletin, although cautioned that of the publication's members, only Agee would have been aware of the foreign government connection. KGB files recovered by Mitrokhin boasted of their ability to pass information and disinformation to Agee.

The magazine was based in Washington DC.

CovertAction Quarterly 
In 1992, with the issue #43, the magazine was renamed as CovertAction Quarterly. In 1998, the magazine won an award from Project Censored for a story by Lawrence Soley in the Spring 1997 issue titled "Phi Beta Capitalism", about corporate influence on universities.

Publication of CovertAction Quarterly ceased in 2005 with issue #78, only to be resurrected as CovertAction Magazine in 2018.

Several articles from CovertAction Quarterly were collected in two anthologies, CovertAction: The Roots of Terrorism and Bioterror: Manufacturing Wars The American Way, both published by Ocean Press in 2003.

Selected personnel
 Jim Wilcott, member of the Board of Advisors. He spent nine years with the CIA as a finance officer, and his wife Elsie also worked for the Agency during the same period.

Publications
Anthologies
 CovertAction: The Roots of Terrorism, edited by Ellen Ray & William H. Schaap. Ocean Press (2003). . 310 pages. Excerpts.
 Bioterror: Manufacturing Wars the American Way, edited by Ellen Ray & William H. Schaap. Ocean Press (2003). . 80 pages.

Magazines
 CovertAction Information Bulletin (1978-1992). 
 Issues no. 1–42.
 CovertAction Quarterly (1992-2005).
 Issues no. 43–78.
 CovertAction Magazine (2018–present).
 Issues no. 79–present.

See also 
 CounterSpy
 Lobster

References

Notes

Footnotes

External links
 Official Website
 Official Archives
 Complete archive at Internet Archive
 Appearances on C-SPAN
 Profile at The Freedom Archives
 Profile in Conspiracy Theories in American History: An Encyclopedia, vol. 1, edited by Peter Knight. ABC-CLIO (2013), pp. 212-213.
 CIA Archive Collection (1978-1987) at Internet Archive
 Interview with Lou Wolf. Our Hidden History (May 31, 2018).

1978 establishments in Washington, D.C.
2005 disestablishments in Washington, D.C.
Defunct political magazines published in the United States
Quarterly magazines published in the United States
Books about the Central Intelligence Agency
Defunct magazines published in the United States
Intelligence websites
Magazines about espionage
Magazines established in 1978
Magazines disestablished in 2005
Magazines published in Washington, D.C.